This is a list of people who have appeared on currency issued by Australia since that country introduced its own notes and coins in 1910.

Those appearing on the current series are shown in bold.

Legend:
 N = note
 C = coin
 P = primary image
 W = watermark
 /- = shilling
 d = pence
 c = cents

References

 
Coins of Australia
 
Numismatics
Currency
Australian
People on banknotes